Dániel Kovács (born 27 July 1990) is a Hungarian football player who currently plays for Kozármisleny SE.

References 
 APEP Pitsilia Official Website
Tagblatt
HLSZ 
MLSZ 

1990 births
Living people
Footballers from Budapest
Hungarian footballers
Association football midfielders
APEP FC players
Vasas SC players
Kozármisleny SE footballers
Nemzeti Bajnokság I players
Cypriot First Division players
Hungarian expatriate footballers
Expatriate footballers in Switzerland
Expatriate footballers in Cyprus
Hungarian expatriate sportspeople in Switzerland
Hungarian expatriate sportspeople in Cyprus